Castle Law is a hill south west of Fairmilehead in the Pentland Hills in Midlothian, Scotland.

It is best known for the Iron Age hill fort on its slopes.

The Castlelaw Hill Fort

The Castlelaw Hill Fort is the remnant of a stronghold of the Iron Age.  When it was occupied the site consisted of three earthwork ramparts, ditches and timber palisades.  The fort contained a Souterrain for the storage of agricultural produce.  V. Gordon Childe undertook excavations at Castlelaw in 1932–33.  The work focused on the rampart, and showed that it consisted of a clay and timber filling, faced by stone.

The fort commands views over the Forth and Lothian.  Traprain Law and Berwick Law, both significant centres of power in the Iron Age, are visible from the site.

The fort is maintained by Historic Environment Scotland as a scheduled monument.

Access to the site is free but, since the area is an active sheep pasture, dogs should be kept under control.
The site also neighbours an army firing range and so care should be taken not to pass into the area marked by red flags.

References

External links
 
 
 
 

Hills of the Scottish Midland Valley
Hill forts in Scotland
Archaeological sites in Midlothian
Scheduled Ancient Monuments in Midlothian
Historic Environment Scotland properties
Mountains and hills of Midlothian